The Optare Vecta was a step-entrance single-deck bus body manufactured by Optare between 1991 and 1997 on the MAN 11.180 and 11.190 chassis.  

The Vecta was largely similar to the Delta body on the DAF SB220, but had a straight front end with a separately mounted destination display. Most were based on the 11.190 chassis, but there were also two built on the less powerful 11.180. The Vecta was built for medium-length chassis whereas the Sigma was built for full length chassis as the Dennis Lance chassis.

A total of 130 were built, with United Automobile Services purchasing 51, including the first two. Trent Buses 15 and while Reading Buses 14.

References

External links

Midibuses
Vecta
Step-entrance buses
Vehicles introduced in 1991